Julia Julia is a 1981 Norwegian comedy film directed by Petter Vennerød and Svend Wam. The film was selected as the Norwegian entry for the Best Foreign Language Film at the 54th Academy Awards, but was not accepted as a nominee.

Cast
 Gunilla Olsson as Julia
 Knut Husebø as Karl Henrik
 Audun Meling as Fred
 Thomas Robsahm as Dag
 Per Sunderland as Petter

See also
 List of submissions to the 54th Academy Awards for Best Foreign Language Film
 List of Norwegian submissions for the Academy Award for Best Foreign Language Film

References

External links
 

1981 films
1981 comedy films
Norwegian comedy films
1980s Norwegian-language films
Films directed by Svend Wam
Films directed by Petter Vennerød